Ant Atoll is a small atoll lying off the west coast of Pohnpei in the Federated States of Micronesia. Along with the nearby Pakin Atoll, these islands constitute the Senyavin group of islands.

Ant's first European visitor was Álvaro de Saavedra on 14 September 1529 shortly before his death, in his second attempt to return from Tidore to New Spain. It was later visited by Pedro Fernandez de Quiros, commanding the Spanish ship San Jeronimo on 23 December 1595. Fernandez de Quirós had assumed the command of the Spanish expedition of Alvaro de Mendaña after his death  Etienne DeCroissant briefly sailed by the islands on her exploration trip to the region.

Ant is a popular site with tourists for diving and snorkelling, and is the site of several colonies of seabirds, notably black noddys. There is a small settlement on the atoll that is inhabited part-time.

There is evidence of an ancient civilization on the island, which might have been built by the same people who built the nearby Nan Madol.

See also

 Desert island
 List of islands

References

Atolls of the Federated States of Micronesia
Islands of Pohnpei
Uninhabited islands of the Federated States of Micronesia